Viktória Scholczová (born 2 August 2000) is a Slovak female canoeist who was 7th with Katarína Kopúnová in the C2 sprint senior final at the 2019 Wildwater Canoeing World Championships.

Achievements

References

External links
 

2000 births
Living people
Slovak female canoeists
Place of birth missing (living people)